General Juan José Pérez Municipality or Charazani Municipality is the first municipal section of the Bautista Saavedra Province in the  La Paz Department, Bolivia. Its seat is Charazani.

See also 
 Ch'uxña Quta
 Qachu Quta

References 

 Instituto Nacional de Estadística de Bolivia

Municipalities of La Paz Department (Bolivia)